Kentucky Route 353 (KY 353) (Russell Cave Road) a  state highway in the U.S. state of Kentucky. The highway connects Fayette, Bourbon, and Harrison counties with Lexington.

Route description

Fayette County
KY 353 begins at an intersection with KY 4 (New Circle Road) in the central part of Lexington, within Fayette County, where the roadway continues as Russell Cave Road. It travels to the northeast and curves to the north-northeast. It passes Elkhorn Park and the Northside Branch of the Lexington Public Library. It travels just east of Martin Luther King Park and crosses over I-64/I-75. It intersects KY 1973 (Iron Works Pike). It passes Russell Cave Elementary School and a building that houses radio stations WLAP and WMXL. The highway curves to the northeast. It crosses over North Elkhorn Creek and then curves to the north-northeast. It intersects the western terminus of KY 1876 (Greenwich Pike) and curves to the north-northwest. At an intersection with the eastern terminus of KY 1962 (Old Lemons Mill Road), it curves to the north-northeast. The highway curves to the northeast and crosses over Goose Creek. It curves to the north-northeast and intersects the western terminus of KY 1939 (Hume Bedford Pike). It then leaves the city limits of Lexington and enters Bourbon County.

Bourbon and Harrison counties
KY 353 curves to the north-northwest and enters Centerville. There, it intersects U.S. Route 460 (US 460; Georgetown Road). It curves to the north-northeast. It curves to the northeast and begins paralleling Townsend Creek. It curves to the north-northeast and crosses over the creek. At this bridge, it leaves the creek. It curves to the north-northeast and begins paralleling Silas Creek. It curves to the north and crosses over the creek, where it enters Harrison County. It curves to the north-northeast and crosses over Huskens Run. It curves to the northwest and enters Broadwell, where it meets its northern terminus, an intersection with US 62 (Leesburg Pike).

Major intersections

KY 353 curves to the north-northwest and enters Centerville. There, it intersects U.S. Route 460 (US 460; Georgetown Road). It curves to the north-northeast. It curves to the northeast and begins paralleling Townsend Creek. It curves to the north-northeast and crosses over the creek. At this bridge, it leaves the creek. It curves to the north-northeast and begins paralleling Silas Creek. It curves to the north and crosses over the creek, where it enters Harrison County. It curves to the north-northeast and crosses over Huskens Run. It curves to the northwest and enters Broadwell, where it meets its northern terminus, an intersection with US 62 (Leesburg Pike).

See also

References

0353
Transportation in Lexington, Kentucky
Transportation in Bourbon County, Kentucky
Transportation in Harrison County, Kentucky